Lebow, also LeBow, is a surname. Notable people with the surname include:

 Bennett S. LeBow, American businessman and philanthropist
 Bennett S. LeBow College of Business
 Fred Lebow (1932–1994), American runner, race director, and founder of the New York City Marathon
 Fredric Lebow American screenwriter
 Jay Lebow (born 1948), American family psychologist
 Richard Ned Lebow, American political scientist 
 Theo Lebow (born 1986), American tenor

Surnames